Sifiso Mlungwana (born 27 April 1997) is a South African soccer player currently playing as a goalkeeper for Lamontville Golden Arrows.

Career statistics

Club

Notes

References

1997 births
Living people
People from uMhlabuyalingana Local Municipality
Zulu people
South African soccer players
South Africa youth international soccer players
Association football goalkeepers
South African Premier Division players
Lamontville Golden Arrows F.C. players
Footballers at the 2020 Summer Olympics
Olympic soccer players of South Africa
Soccer players from KwaZulu-Natal